This list of mammals of Minnesota includes the mammals native to Minnesota. It also shows their status in the wild. There are 84 mammal species found in the state. Minnesota does not have a state mammals but several were proposed: The northern white tailed deer was proposed eight times, the eastern wolf was proposed six times, the American black bear and thirteen-lined ground squirrel were each proposed once.

The following tags are used to highlight each species' conservation status as assessed by the International Union for Conservation of Nature; those on the left are used here, those in the second column in some other articles:

Didelphimorphs

Opossums
Virginia opossum, Didelphis virginiana

Rodents

Squirrels
Northern flying squirrel, Glaucomys sabrinus 
Southern flying squirrel, Glaucomys volans 
Woodchuck, Marmota monax 
Least chipmunk, Neotamias minimus 
Eastern gray squirrel, Sciurus carolinensis 
Fox squirrel, Sciurus niger 
Franklin's ground squirrel, Spermophilus franklinii 
Richardson's ground squirrel, Spermophilus richardsonii 
Thirteen-lined ground squirrel, Spermophilus tridecemlineatus 
Eastern chipmunk, Tamias striatus 
American red squirrel, Tamiasciurus hudsonicus 
Black-tailed prairie dog, Cynomys ludovicianus  introduced

Beavers
American beaver, Castor canadensis

Gophers
Plains pocket gopher, Geomys bursarius 
Northern pocket gopher, Thomomys talpoides

Pocket mice
Plains pocket mouse, Perognathus flavescens

Cricetids
Eastern deer mouse, Peromyscus maniculatus 
White-footed mouse, Peromyscus leucopus 
Western deer mouse, Peromyscus sonoriensis 
Western harvest mouse, Reithrodontomys megalotis 
Northern grasshopper mouse, Onychomys leucogaster 
Northern bog lemming, Synaptomys borealis 
Southern bog lemming, Synaptomys cooperi 
Rock vole, Microtus chrotorrhinus 
Prairie vole, Microtus ochrogaster 
Woodland vole, Microtus pinetorum 
Meadow vole, Microtus pennsylvanicus 
Eastern heather vole, Phenacomys ungava 
Southern red-backed vole, Myodes gapperi 
Muskrat, Ondatra zibethicus

Murids
House mouse, Mus musculus   introduced
Brown rat, Rattus norvegicus   introduced

Jumping mice
Meadow jumping mouse, Zapus hudsonius 
Woodland jumping mouse, Napaeozapus insignis

Porcupines
North American porcupine, Erethizon dorsatum

Lagomorphs

Hares
Snowshoe hare, Lepus americanus 
White-tailed jackrabbit, Lepus townsendii

Cottontail rabbits
Eastern cottontail, Sylvilagus floridanus

Eulipotyphlans

Shrews
Northern short-tailed shrew, Blarina brevicauda 
North American least shrew, Cryptotis parva 
Arctic shrew, Sorex arcticus 
Masked shrew, Sorex cinereus 
American pygmy shrew, Sorex hoyi 
American water shrew, Sorex palustris

Moles
Star-nosed mole, Condylura cristata 
Eastern mole, Scalopus aquaticus

Bats

Evening bats
Big brown bat, Eptesicus fuscus 
Silver-haired bat, Lasionycteris noctivagans 
Hoary bat, Lasiurus cinereus 
Eastern red bat, Lasiurus borealis 
Little brown bat, Myotis lucifugus 
Northern long-eared myotis, Myotis septentrionalis 
Eastern pipistrelle, Pipistrellus subflavus

Carnivorans

Procyonids
Common raccoon, Procyon lotor

Mustelids
Wolverine, Gulo gulo  extirpated
Northern river otter, Lontra canadensis 
American marten, Martes americana 
Least weasel, Mustela nivalis 
American ermine, Mustela richardsonii 
Western Great Lakes stoat, M. r. bangsi 
Beringian ermine or stoat, Mustela erminea 
Long-tailed weasel, Neogale frenata 
American mink, Neogale vison 
Fisher, Pekania pennanti 
American badger, Taxidea taxus

Skunks
Striped skunk, Mephitis mephitis 
Eastern spotted skunk, Spilogale putorius

Canines
Coyote, Canis latrans 
Gray wolf, Canis lupus 
Eastern wolf, Canis lycaon 
Gray fox, Urocyon cinereoargenteus 
Swift fox, Vulpes velox  vagrant
Red fox, Vulpes vulpes 
American red fox, V. v. fulva 
Northern plains fox, V. v. regalis

Felines
Canada lynx, Lynx canadensis  
Bobcat, Lynx rufus 
Cougar, Puma concolor  vagrant

Bears
American black bear, Ursus americanus

Artiodactyls

Deer
Moose, Alces alces 
Elk, Cervus canadensis 
White-tailed deer, Odocoileus virginianus 
Northern white-tailed deer, O. v. borealis 
Dakota white-tailed deer, O. v. dacotensis 
Kansas white-tailed deer, O. v. macrourus 
Caribou, Rangifer tarandus  extirpated 
Woodland caribou, R. t. caribou extirpated
Mule deer, Odocoileus hemionus

Pronghorn
Pronghorn, Antilocapra americana  vagrant

Bovids
American bison, Bison bison  extirpated
Plains bison, B. b. bison extirpated

Pigs
Wild boar, Sus scrofa  introduced

References

Burt, W. H., and R. P. Grossenheider (1976). Field Guide to the Mammals: North America North of Mexico. Third edition. Houghton Mifflin Company, Boston, Massachusetts, US.
Gunderson, H. L., and J. R. Beer (1953). "Mammals of Minnesota". Occasional Papers, Minnesota Museum of Natural History, University of Minnesota. 6: 1-190.
Hazard, E. B. 1982. Mammals of Minnesota. University of Minnesota Press, Minneapolis, Minnesota.
Heany, L. R., and E. C. Birney (1975). "Comments on the distribution and natural history of some mammals in Minnesota". Canadian Field-Naturalist. 89 (1): 29-34.
Wiche, J. M. and J. F. Cassel (1978). "Checklist of North Dakota mammals. (Revised)". The Prairie Naturalist 10 (3): 81-88.
Wilson, D. E., and F. R. Cole (2000). Common Names of the Mammals of the World. Smithsonian Institution Press, Washington, D.C., US.

Minnesota
Mammals